"Tony" is the first episode of British drama series, Skins. It was written by Bryan Elsley and directed by Paul Gay. It is told from the point of view of main character Tony Stonem. It aired on E4 on 25 January 2007.

Plot 

The episode begins with Tony waking up in his room on an average morning. He distracts his angry, overly vocal father in order for his younger sister Effy to get inside unnoticed. He also stares at Miriam, a naked woman changing in front of her bedroom window across the street. Tony continues to irritate his father by locking him out of the bathroom and exiting through the window, leaving the door locked. Tony's father swears a great deal, seemingly constantly much to their mother Anthea's annoyance.

Tony then leaves for college and on the way rings his friends and tries to organise a night out so they can help his best friend Sid lose his virginity. Tony and Sid meet for breakfast in a café where Tony tells Sid that they will get a girl "spliffed up" so she will have sex with Sid. Sid assumes he will get to have sex with Tony's girlfriend - the beautiful Michelle - and it is revealed that Sid is very attracted to her. Michelle and Tony tell Sid he is being set up with Cassie, who was recently in a psychiatric hospital and is good in bed provided she is not hungry, according to "everyone". Tony asks Sid to pick up some drugs off his dealer, Mad Twatter.

Tony auditions for the city chamber choir and succeeds in getting a part. He then flirts with a private school girl Abigail Stock and agrees to attend her house party with his friends. Most of his friends, however, have other plans. Tony's openly gay friend Maxxie is taking Chris and Anwar on a big, gay night out. Tony, now aware via Chris that Bristol (the show's setting) is awash with cannabis, tries to call Sid to tell him not to buy the drugs, but Sid has his mobile phone switched off. Sid asks Mad about buying drugs on credit terms, but is bullied into purchasing three ounces instead of the intended ounce by the deranged, moustached drug dealer. He warns Sid that if he has not paid him the three hundred pounds within the time given, he will take Sid's testicles as "collateral".

The gang arrive at Abigail's party and Sid meets Cassie, who tells him he is cute, and is delighted that he will not make her eat anything. In Abigail's house, they are told to remove their shoes in order to prevent staining the brand new carpet imported from Iran. They also cannot smoke anything in the house on account of the expensive wallpaper. Tony and Michelle scoff at the dull, lifeless party the wealthy "posh" kids are enjoying and decide to show them up with seductive dancing.

Sid goes to find Cassie, and they discuss her anorexia. While they talk, Chris, Anwar and Maxxie arrive, having found Bristol's gay scene dull. While Chris dirties the floor with his shoes, the posh kids gang up on the newcomers, and a fight begins after Tony punches a posh boy in the face. The fight is broken up as Sid runs in with an unconscious Cassie, who told him she had taken pills before passing out. The group, along with a posh Polish girl from the party, steal a Mercedes car and drive Cassie to the city hospital, where Cassie wakes, seemingly fine. The gang then drive to the harbour. While parked, Sid accidentally hits the car's handbrake while searching for skins in Tony's back pocket. The car rolls into the harbour, destroying the three ounces of spliff.

The group, minus Chris and the Pole, climb out of the submerged car and walk home. Tony and Sid later retire to Tony's bed, with both of them depressed that Sid is still a virgin despite being sixteen, which Tony feels is embarrassing. Sid asks Tony if Chris and the Pole got out of the car at the hospital; Tony says that they did.

Main cast
 Nicholas Hoult as Tony Stonem
 Mike Bailey as Sid Jenkins
 April Pearson as Michelle Richardson
 Hannah Murray as Cassie Ainsworth
 Joe Dempsie as Chris Miles
 Mitch Hewer as Maxxie Oliver
 Dev Patel as Anwar Kharral
 Larissa Wilson as Jal Fazer
 Siwan Morris as Angie

Arc significance and continuity

Tony's home life
 The family tread carefully around an angry, unpleasant father, Jim, who swears too often and is easily angered beyond reasoning.
 Tony has a younger sister, Effy, who despite being only in Year 10 of secondary school is out partying all night.
 Tony's house looks to be in an upper middle class area of Bristol.

Series relevance
 We are introduced to the series regulars:
 Tony Stonem A manipulative, narcissistic and intelligent teenager who is the group's leader and has a girlfriend, yet flirts with other girls.
 Sid Jenkins A self-conscious "sidekick" to Tony, forever in his friend's shadow. Sid is a virgin and is in love with Tony's girlfriend, Michelle. Sid sleeps a lot and is doing poorly in college.
 Chris Miles A party-goer and experimentalist with various drugs. Chris does anything for fun and is in love with his psychology teacher, Angie. He has a sweet "schoolboy" love for her and every day offers to carry her books. He even badmouths his own Health Science teacher for making Angie upset.
 Maxxie Oliver A gay dancer and actor whose current ambition is to include a tap dancing routine in Death of a Salesman. Despite being gay, he is best friends with Anwar, who is a Muslim. This unorthodox relationship causes problems toward the end of the season.
 Anwar Kharral A Muslim of Pakistani descent. Despite being a Muslim, Anwar consumes alcohol and drugs and hopes to lose his virginity before marriage. His best friend is Maxxie, who is gay, which causes problems later in the series. These, along with his English accent, indicate that Anwar grew up in the United Kingdom rather than Pakistan. Whether he is British by birth or immigrated to Britain is never stated.
 Jal Fazer Daughter of (fictional) famous reggae and grime artist Ronny Fazer, she is a dedicated clarinetist. She is portrayed as slightly more conservative and prudent than the others, but not excessively so.
 Michelle Richardson Tony's girlfriend, she has been best friends with Sid and Tony for years. She puts up with continuous insults from Tony including him nicknaming her "Nips" because "her nipples are funny" and "one breast is bigger than the other". She seems to love Tony more than he loves her despite him being flirtatious with other girls.
 Cassie Ainsworth is an anorexic sex addict. She refuses to eat, but instead has regular casual sex and does drugs, but not weed because "it makes you hungry". She also suffers from mild OCD and likes to arrange food in people's cabinets. She is spacey and says "wow" very often in a dazed tone and is very blunt. She has a crush on Sid.
 Effy Stonem is Tony's little sister, initially introduced as a recurring character, she later becomes a main character in season three after Tony leaves for university and she begins college. For almost the entirety of the first season, she does not speak, however she is a wild club-goer who drinks, smokes and parties all night despite her young age of fourteen.
 Sid purchases drugs on credit from Mad Twatter and loses them in the harbour.
 Sid fails to lose his virginity, but does strike a connection with Cassie.

U.S. version
This episode is remade almost shot-for-shot for the U.S. adaption of Skins.
Differences include
The show's setting was changed from Bristol to an unnamed Eastern seaboard city.
Tony's surname is changed to Snyder
Chris's surname is changed to Collins
Effy is renamed Eura
Cassie is renamed Cadie
Sid is renamed Stanley
Abigail does not appear
Maxxie is replaced by Tea Marvelli, an out lesbian

Soundtrack
 Right Thurr by Chingy
 Finer Truths, White Lies by Napalm Death
 As Serious as Your Life by Four Tet
 Dirt by Death in Vegas
 On the Street Where You Live by Nicholas Hoult
 Bounty Hunter by Barrington Levy
 Drop Ya Thangs by The Game
 Star Guitar by The Chemical Brothers
 All Around the World by Lisa Stansfield
 Monkey Ska by Derrick Harriott
 Totally Wired by The Fall
 Flesh and Bone by Brendan Benson
 Witness (One Hope) by Roots Manuva

References

External links 
 Skins at Channel 4
 Skins at E4

2007 British television episodes
British LGBT-related television episodes
British television series premieres
Skins (British TV series) episodes